Vicecomodoro Ángel de la Paz Aragonés Airport  is located  northwest of downtown Santiago del Estero, the capital of Santiago del Estero Province in Argentina. The airport covers an area of 526 hectares (1299 acres) and is operated by Aeropuertos Argentina 2000.

Also known as Santiago del Estero Airport or Mal Paso Airport, it was built in 1959 and the runway was re-paved in 2001. It has a  terminal and 45 parking spaces. In 2007, it handled 49,517 passengers. The airport does not handle international flights. It is served by Flybondi 737-800.

Runway length includes a  blast pad on Runway 03. Runway 03 has an additional  paved overrun. The Santiago Del Estero VOR (Ident: SDE) and non-directional beacon (Ident: D) are located on the field.

Airlines and destinations

See also

Transport in Argentina
List of airports in Argentina

References

External links 
OpenStreetMap - Santiago del Estero Airport
OurAirports - Vicecomodoro Angel D. La Paz Aragonés Airport

Airports in Argentina
Buildings and structures in Santiago del Estero Province